Victor Atta-Baffoe is an Anglican bishop and scholar in Ghana: he is the current Bishop of Cape Coast.

References

Anglican bishops of Cape Coast
21st-century Anglican bishops in Ghana
Year of birth missing (living people)
Living people